The State Museum of Pennsylvania is a non-profit museum at 300 North Street in downtown Harrisburg, Pennsylvania. It is run by the state through the Pennsylvania Historical and Museum Commission and was created to preserve and interpret the region's history and culture. It is a part of the Pennsylvania State Capitol Complex. While it is officially named the State Museum of Pennsylvania, members of the public, as well as official publications, sometimes refer to the facility as the William Penn Memorial Museum; the museum's central hall features a large statue of Penn.

Exhibits
The museum includes a multi-media planetarium, as well as four floors of exhibits and displays covering Pennsylvania history from prehistoric times through current events. Visitation averages 315,000 people annually. Among the features are a large collection of artifacts and displays related to the American Civil War, as well as an extensive collection of industrial and technological innovations. Artwork, paintings, dioramas, and other audio-visuals aid in the interpretation. There are over three million objects in the museum's collections. The museum has many exhibits that showcase Pennsylvania history. The state museum divided there exhibits into three different categories; permanent, changing and online exhibits.

History
On March 28, 1905, Governor Samuel W. Pennypacker signed legislation creating The State Museum of Pennsylvania.  The museums purpose during the time was to for the "preservation of objects illustrations the flora and fauna of the state and mineralogy, geology, archaeology, arts and history." The State Museum of Pennsylvania mission statement was influenced by the many other state museums that were already established such as New York, Illinois and Indiana.  Later in the year 1905, Governor Pennypacker of Pennsylvania signed Act 481 which is what gave the State Museum their $20,000 start-up money for the museum.  March 1, 1907, the museum staff and collection moved into the Executive Office Building. It became part of the Pennsylvania Historical and Museum Commission in 1945, and moved to its present building in 1964. It is located adjacent to the State Capitol Building. The building is round and the museum exhibits are located on the ground, first, second, and third floors, with offices of the museum staff and Pennsylvania Historical and Museum Commission on the fourth and fifth floors.  The building was listed on the National Register of Historic Places in 2014.

References

External links
 Official website

1905 establishments in Pennsylvania
American Civil War museums in Pennsylvania
Art in Harrisburg, Pennsylvania
Art museums and galleries in Pennsylvania
Government buildings on the National Register of Historic Places in Pennsylvania
History museums in Pennsylvania
Industry museums in Pennsylvania
Modernist architecture in Pennsylvania
Pennsylvania State Museum
Museums in Harrisburg, Pennsylvania
Museums on the National Register of Historic Places
National Register of Historic Places in Harrisburg, Pennsylvania
Natural history museums in Pennsylvania
Pennsylvania State Capitol Complex
Paleontology in Pennsylvania
Planetaria in the United States
Transportation museums in Pennsylvania